The 2007–08 FA Cup qualifying rounds opened the 127th season of competition in England for 'The Football Association Challenge Cup' (FA Cup), the world's oldest association football single knockout competition. A total of 729 clubs were accepted for the competition, up 42 from the previous season's 687.

The large number of clubs entering the tournament from lower down (Levels 5 through 10) in the English football pyramid meant that the competition started with six rounds of preliminary (2) and qualifying (4) knockouts for these non-League teams. The 32 winning teams from Fourth qualifying round progressed to the First Round Proper, where League teams tiered at Levels 3 and 4 entered the competition.

Calendar
The calendar for the 2007–08 FA Cup qualifying rounds, as announced by The FA.

Extra preliminary round
Matches played on the weekend of Saturday 18 August 2007. 342 clubs from Level 9 and Level 10 of English football, entered at this stage of the competition, while other 38 clubs from levels 9 and 10 get a bye to the preliminary round.

Preliminary round
Matches played on the weekend of Saturday 1 September 2007. A total of 332 clubs took part in this stage of the competition, including the 171 winners from the extra preliminary round, 38 clubs from Levels 9-10, who get a bye in the extra preliminary round and 123 entering at this stage from the six leagues at Level 8 of English football. The round featured 48 clubs from Level 10 still in the competition, being the lowest ranked clubs in this round.

First qualifying round
Matches played on the weekend of Saturday 15 September 2007. A total of 232 clubs took part in this stage of the competition, including the 166 winners from the preliminary round and 66 entering at this stage from the top division of the three leagues at Level 7 of English football. The round featured 14 clubs from Level 10 still in the competition, being the lowest ranked clubs in this round.

Second qualifying round
Matches played on the weekend of Saturday 29 September 2007. A total of 160 clubs took part in this stage of the competition, including the 116 winners from the First qualifying round and 44 Level 6 clubs, from Conference North and Conference South, entering at this stage. Six clubs from Level 10 of English football were the lowest-ranked clubs to qualify for this round of the competition.

Third qualifying round
Matches played on the weekend of Saturday 13 October 2007. A total of 80 clubs took part, all having progressed from the Second qualifying round. Dinnington Town and Rainworth Miners Welfare from Level 10 of English football were the lowest-ranked clubs to qualify for this round of the competition.

Fourth qualifying round
Matches played on the weekend of Saturday 27 October 2007. A total of 64 clubs took part, 40 having progressed from the Third qualifying round and 24 clubs from Conference Premier, forming Level 5 of English football, entering at this stage. Eight clubs from Level 8 of English football were the lowest-ranked clubs to qualify for this round of the competition.

Competition proper
See 2007–08 FA Cup for details of the rounds from the first round proper onwards.

References

External links
 Football Club History Database: FA Cup 2007–08
 The FA Cup Archive

FA Cup qualifying rounds
Qual